The Strasberry or Fragaria × ananassa 'Mieze Schindler' is a variety of the garden strawberry, with a raspberry-like appearance, originally developed by the German breeder Otto Schindler in 1925.  It is similarly soft textured, with characteristics that are similar to raspberries, such as being a deeper red, being rounder and having a bumpy exterior. They are also smaller than an average garden strawberry and have deeper achenes. Unlike other garden strawberry varieties 'Mieze Schindler' produces no fertile pollen and will need a pollinator. Despite its much-valued flavor the variety was threatened by extinction but plants survived in amateur gardens in the former German Democratic Republic until they were reintroduced as a commercial variety by a Dutch farmer in the twenty-first century.
Since 2013 a hybrid, self-pollinating version of this strawberry has been marketed under the new trade name Framberry.

References

External links 

Strawberry cultivars